José María Córdova International Airport  is an international airport located in the city of Rionegro,  south-east of Medellín, and is the second largest airport in Colombia after El Dorado International Airport of Bogotá in terms of infrastructure and passenger service. The airport is named after José María Córdova (sometimes spelled "Córdoba"), a Colombian army general who was a native of Ríonegro.

It serves the Medellin Metropolitan Area and is the most important airport in the Antioquia Department; in terms of infrastructure, it is the most important in western Colombia. It was also the main hub for low-cost airline Viva Air Colombia until the airline ceased operating in February of 2023. It serves several international destinations, one of the busiest being the route to Miami International Airport. It also serves the most flown route within Colombia: Rionegro-Bogota, which is mainly operated by Avianca and LATAM Colombia. In recent years, significant technology and infrastructure upgrades (like the addition of LCD screens and escalators) have been made, making it one of the most recognized airports in Colombia. It now has service to destinations in Europe and has added new destinations in the Americas, along with the Caribbean as well.

International destinations include the United States, Panama, Venezuela, Peru, Mexico, Dominican Republic and Spain. The airport also serves domestic flights to most major Colombian cities such as Bogota, Cali, Barranquilla, Cartagena, Santa Marta and San Andres Island.
Freight transport is also one of the strengths of the terminal, providing air transportation to most of the flower exports (and other products) from Antioquia bound to the Americas and Europe.

Description 

The airport serves all major international and some minor domestic routes for the Medellín metro area, in contrast to the in-town, yet much smaller Olaya Herrera Airport, which serves the Medellín area with domestic flights only. The airport is about a 30 minute drive from the proper city of Medellín.

The runway is also used by the nearby military base of the Colombian Air Force located in Rionegro, named Air Combat Command No. 5 (CACOM 5), where all types of military and national police aircraft arrive and depart.

The airport has air navigation aids such as VOR, NDB, and ILS, which makes navigation and landings safer in bad weather.

Antioquia's exports, mostly flowers and other products from the region, depart en route to international destinations from these terminals. The cargo operator Avianca Cargo has its main base at the airport, and operates flights to countries in South, Central and North America.

The airport was built with a dome shaped roof. It has many restaurants and shops, including a duty-free shop after clearing security. There are also banks, money exchange, and car rental services. Avianca has a VIP room, and there is also a VIP airport lounge called "The Lounge Medellin" which is operated by Global Lounge Network. Outside the main building is a parking lot and garage, which includes an area for motorcycles.

History 

Between 1930 and 1932, three wealthy families in the metropolitan area of Medellín began with the idea of providing the city with an airport, as they were part of the Colombian Air Navigation Company which sought to carry passengers and mail from the city of Medellín to Puerto Berrio, along the Magdalena River and ultimately connect the cities of Medellín and Bogotá. One of the most important was Gonzalo Mejia, who in a very colloquial manner determined what would be the only place where an airport could be built; this location was later confirmed by the Curtis Wright firm based in New York City.

After several obstacles, the city of Medellín finally approved the construction of an unpaved runway about 974 m long, which would later become Enrique Olaya Herrera Airport. Companies like Saco and Scadta from the cities of Barranquilla and Bogotá soon began service. Then, in the 70s, the need for a larger airport for the province of Antioquia arose due to the limitations of the Olaya Herrera Airport caused by insufficient space to expand. Two sites were proposed for the new airport: one in the vicinity of the municipality of Barbosa northeast of the city, and another in the valley of San Nicolas in Rionegro, east of the city. The latter was selected and construction began.

The airport opened on August 29, 1985. During the same year, Avianca conducted test flights of its Boeing 747, first on the original runway at Olaya Herrera Airport, and then at the new José María Córdova. During this time the airport had significant movement of cargo and passengers, as the Olaya Herrera airport was closed from 1986 until 1991. When the Olaya Herrera Airport reopened, traffic reduced, but despite the reduction in domestic traffic, international traffic has seen exponential growth. Today, the Olaya Herrera Airport still has significant passenger movements, because it is a main hub for domestic flights within Colombia and the preferred option for domestic flights out of Medellin.

In January 2006, an Airbus A380 landed at the airport to conduct technical tests of the engines. This was the first time a plane of that type had landed on Colombian soil, and also the first time it happened in South America.

In 2016, the airport handled 7,376,160 passengers, and 6,892,104 in 2017.

In August 2019, a new highway opened, which cut the traveling time from the airport to Medellín from 45 minutes to just 20 minutes. The route includes a tunnel called "Tunel de Oriente". The total cost of the project was 1.1 billion pesos.

Renovation and expansion 
The expansion increased the passenger handling capacity to 11 million annually. Other improvements included more food and shopping options, more digital displays with flight information, more car rental options, and the addition of a duty-free shop. The total cost of the works was 350 billion pesos.

The cargo terminal expansion was completed in February 2020 at a cost of around $110 million pesos.

Airlines and destinations

Passenger

The following airlines operate regular scheduled and charter flights at the airport.

Cargo

Statistics

Accidents and incidents 

 On May 19, 1993, SAM Colombia Flight 501 crashed in to Mt. Paramo Frontino while making an approach to this airport.
 On December 21, 1996, an Antonov An-32B aircraft (registration HK-4008X) operated by SELVA Colombia crashed while on final approach to runway 36. The aircraft had taken off from Bogota for its usual cargo flight to José María Córdova Airport with 6 tons of cargo. During the approach phase, the plane veered three miles to the left of the glide slope, then turned sharply right, finally crashing more than five miles from the south end of the airport. The crash killed all four occupants of the aircraft.
 On December 22, 1998, an Antonov An-32B aircraft (registration HK-3930X) crashed while approaching the runway. The aircraft had taken off from Bogota for a cargo flight to the airport. The accident occurred at dawn and weather conditions were very bad due to the dense fog that was present in the area. The accident killed all five occupants of the aircraft. A similar incident had occurred two years earlier, with a plane of the same company in similar circumstances.
 On October 15, 2004, a Douglas DC-3 (registration HK-1503) belonging to the company Aerovanguardia took off at 6:30 am from La Vanguardia Airport in Villavicencio for a cargo flight. At 7:30, air traffic control informed the pilots that the airport was closed due to poor visibility caused by fog. The pilot of the aircraft decided to fly to the alternate Olaya Herrera Airport, but the aircraft collided with power cables during descent, crashing in a wooded area near the town of Santa Elena, west of Rionegro, killing all three occupants of the aircraft.
 On June 7, 2006, a Tradewinds Airlines Boeing 747-200F (registration N922FT) had an engine failure on takeoff. The pilot aborted but the plane overran the runway by 150m. None of the 6 on board were injured. The plane was substantially damaged, with the nose gear being completely sheared off.
 On January 3, 2009, American Airlines flight 924, a Boeing 737-800, took off from Jose Maria Cordova Airport and had to make an emergency landing due to fire in one of its engines. Upon landing, the pilot was forced to use the maximum braking, causing the brakes to overheat and one of the tires to explode. The airport was closed for 4 hours, but none of the 148 passengers on board were injured in the crash.
 On November 28, 2016, LaMia Airlines Flight 2933, a Avro RJ85, crashed on its approach to the airport. The plane was carrying members of the Chapecoense football team who were on their way to compete in the 2016 Copa Sudamericana finals. There were 71 fatalities and 6 survivors in the accident.

See also 
Transport in Colombia
List of airports in Colombia

References

External links 

 Airplan - Website 
OpenStreetMap - José María Córdova International Airport

Airports in Colombia
Buildings and structures in Antioquia Department
Airports established in 1985
1985 establishments in Colombia